Mom + Mom is an Italian comedy-drama film, directed by Karole Di Tommaso and released in 2018. The film stars Linda Caridi and Maria Roveran as a lesbian couple who want to become mothers of a child, and are struggling with the bureaucratic and financial burdens of the fertility clinic system.

The film premiered in the Alice nella città stream at the Rome Film Festival in October 2018, before going into wider theatrical release in early 2019. It was picked up for international distribution by TLA Releasing in the United Kingdom and Strand Releasing in the United States, and has screened at various international LGBT film festivals.

Caridi won the award for Best Performance in a Female Role at the 2019 Iris Prize festival.

References

External links
 

2018 films
Italian comedy-drama films
Italian LGBT-related films
2018 LGBT-related films
LGBT-related comedy-drama films
Lesbian-related films
2010s Italian films